Wotton  is a well-wooded parish with one main settlement, a small village mostly south of the A25 between Guildford in the west and Dorking in the east. The nearest village with a small number of shops is Westcott. Wotton lies in a narrow valley, collecting the headwaters of the Tilling Bourne which then has its first combined flow in the Vale of Holmesdale.  The parish is long north to south, reaching to the North Downs escarpment (and the North Downs Way) in the north to the escarpment of the Greensand Ridge at Leith Hill in the south.

Wotton Common forming the south of the parish is elevated woodland dotted with a few vernacular-style houses and has the county's only natural waterfall.  The common's main settlement is Friday Street.

Geography
The civil parish of Wotton is wholly within the Surrey Hills Area of Outstanding Natural Beauty and includes the small village itself, the smaller settlement of Friday Street, Leith Hill to the south and Ranmore Common to the north.  Wotton lies in a small north then west facing valley, amassing the headwaters of the Tilling Bourne joining together in what becomes the west of the Vale of Holmesdale.  The parish is long north to south, reaching to the North Downs escarpment (and the North Downs Way) in the north.  To the south it reaches as far as the escarpment of the Greensand Ridge at Leith Hill.

History

Wotton appears in Domesday Book of 1086 as Odetone. It was held by Osuuold (Oswold). Its domesday assets were: 5 hides; 1 mill worth 1s 8d, 10 ploughs,  of meadow, woodland and herbage worth 73 hogs. It rendered £7 and a half (10s) per year to its overlords, a modest drop since the Norman Conquest.

The English Place-Name Society volume on Surrey (published 1934) records early spellings of Wotton as Wodeton (in 1235, 1258, 1291, 1304, 1317 and 1355), Wudeton (in 1235, 1242 and 1259), Woddeton (in 1304), Woditon (1279) and Wodyton (1443); and variants such as Wodenton (1270) Wodinton (1276 and 1302), Wodynton (1355), Wodyngton (1292, 1380, 1382 and 1456) and Wodington (1324). In 1548 it was "Wodyngeton alias Wotton" and in 1610 it was "Wutton". The same source explains the name as meaning "Farm by the wood", the first element being "Wood" and the final element being "tun" or farmstead.

John Evelyn, the diarist was born at Wotton House in 1620, which includes two grottos in the grounds. In 1694 he moved in as the main legatee. After the Evelyn family relinquished occupation, Wotton House was leased as a training college for the Fire Service from 1947 to 1981 and then, after being empty for nearly 13 years, was converted into a hotel and conference centre with over 100 bedrooms. Three areas of the house remain in the original layout and architectural style, and the hotel has a building and grounds of historic importance from the 17th century.  Its unusually highly II* graded (listed above the grade many comparable parks achieve) garden and architecture for example are well documented.  It has an orangery with decorative parapet and banded piers, terracotta decorations on brickwork, octagonal turrets and stacks, winged gryphons on the porch and Jean Derraux Chinese panels.

The parish church of St John the Evangelist is situated in the scattered hamlet of Wotton at the end of Church Lane overlooking a broad sweep of the North Downs. The parish itself is a long finger stretching from the foot of the North Downs to Friday Street. The founding of the church dates back to Saxon times, although only a few of the original footings now remain to the west of the Norman tower. Much of the church was, of necessity, restored in Victorian times, but there are still many interesting original features to see. John and Mary Evelyn are buried in the Evelyn Chapel in the church.

Demography, economy and housing
At the census of 2011 there were 583 people forming 244 households in the parish. 456 persons are aged 16–74 of which 59 work in extractive or manufacturing industries and 55 run a business.  There is significant gravel quarrying in the region. 94 people walk/cycle to work or work at home and 34 people use public transport to travel to work.

The Wotton House hotel constitutes the largest employer, with many of the farms being arable owing to the rich soil, and it caters for large weddings as well as providing business meetings. To the north and south, on the North Downs and Leith Hill, the land is owned by the National Trust.

The average level of accommodation in the region composed of detached houses was 28%, the average that was apartments was 22.6%.

The proportion of households in the civil parish who owned their home outright compares to the regional average of 35.1%.  The proportion who owned their home with a loan compares to the regional average of 32.5%.  The remaining % is made up of rented dwellings (plus a negligible % of households living rent-free).

Notable people
John Evelyn, diarist, born at Wotton House 1620, and buried (with his wife) in the Evelyn Chapel in St John's Church, Wotton.
Thomas Malthus clergyman and political economist, was curate at Oakwood Chapel in the parish of Wotton, 1789–1834.
Ralph Vaughan Williams, composer, grew up at Leith Hill Place, and owned it briefly in 1944, when he gave it to the National Trust.
Vernon White, the noted theologian, was rector from 1987–1993.

See also
 Friday Street

References

External links

Old photographs
Wotton House website

Friday Street at InfoBritain.com

Villages in Surrey
Mole Valley
Civil parishes in Surrey